is a former Japanese football player.

Playing career
Suda was born in Tokyo on August 22, 1967. After graduating from Keio University, he joined Regional Leagues club Tokyo Gas in 1990. He played many matches as a forward and the club was promoted to the Japan Soccer League in 1991. In 1993, he moved to Urawa Reds. However, he could hardly play in the match. In 1994, he moved to Japan Football League club Kofu SC. Although he played many matches in 1994, he retired at the end of the season.

Club statistics

References

External links

1967 births
Living people
Keio University alumni
Association football people from Tokyo
Japanese footballers
Japan Soccer League players
J1 League players
Japan Football League (1992–1998) players
FC Tokyo players
Urawa Red Diamonds players
Ventforet Kofu players
Association football forwards